Stephen Elliott (born December 3, 1971) is an American writer, editor, and filmmaker currently living in Los Angeles who has written and published seven books and directed two films. He is the founder and former Editor-in-Chief of the online literary magazine The Rumpus. In December 2014, he became senior editor at Epic Magazine.

Background and education
Elliott grew up in Chicago. In his adolescence he was made a ward of the court and placed in several group homes. 
He attended Mather High School and the University of Illinois, and went on to receive his master's degree in cinema studies from Northwestern University in 1996. In 2001, he was awarded the Stegner Fellowship from Stanford University, given to emerging writers in fiction and poetry. He was then the Marsh McCall lecturer in Creative Writing at Stanford University. Elliott is Jewish on his father's side.

Books and journalism
Elliott went on the campaign trail and wrote a book about the 2004 U.S. presidential race, Looking Forward to It: or, How I Learned to Stop Worrying About It and Love the American Electoral Process. His novel Happy Baby, edited by Dave Eggers and co-published by McSweeney's and MacAdam/Cage, was released in February 2004. The paperback of Happy Baby was published by Picador in January 2005. His book My Girlfriend Comes to the City and Beats Me Up is a collection of S&M erotica, sometimes referred to as a sexual memoir, published by Cleis Press in 2006.

In April 2007, he published an essay about his experiment of not using the Internet for one month, writing: "I could feel my attention span lengthening. I would think about problems until I figured them out."

In 2008, he started The Rumpus, an online cultural commentary site.

In 2009, he published a true-crime memoir about the Hans Reiser murder trial called The Adderall Diaries, which was adapted into the 2015 film of the same name, in which James Franco played Elliott.

Films
In 2012, Elliott directed the film About Cherry, based on a script written by Lorelei Lee and himself. The film starred Ashley Hinshaw, James Franco and Dev Patel, and debuted at the 2012 Berlin International Film Festival.

In December 2012, Elliott raised the funds via Kickstarter to shoot his second film, Happy Baby, based on his novel of the same name. Production was completed on July 7, 2013 and the movie was released in 2016.

Published works
Novels

Jones Inn (1998)
A Life Without Consequences (2001)
What It Means to Love you (2002)
Happy Baby (2004)

Essays and Non-fiction

Looking Forward to It: Or, How I Learned to Stop Worrying and Love the American Electoral Process (2004)
The Adderall Diaries: A Memoir of Moods, Masochism, and Murder (2009)
Sometimes I Think About It: Essays (2017)

Short story collections
My Girlfriend Comes to the City and Beats Me Up (2006)

Films
About Cherry (2012)
Happy Baby (2016)
After Adderall (2016)

Awards
2001 Stegner Fellowship

Personal life and allegations of sexual abuse
In November 2015, Claire Vaye Watkins published an essay in Tin House describing an incident where Elliott asked if he could sleep in her bed and left her uncomfortable. In 2017, Elliot was included on the "Shitty Media Men" list, a crowd-sourced Google spreadsheet containing allegations of sexual misconduct against men in the media industry. The allegations against Elliott included "rape accusations, sexual harassment” and “coercion". In October 2018, Elliot filed a lawsuit against the person who started the spreadsheet, journalist Moira Donegan. In March 2023, Elliott reached a settlement with Donegan for a six figure sum.

After Elliott filed the suit against Donegan, according to The Daily Beast, former Rumpus managing editor Lyz Lenz accused Elliott of groping her and described on Twitter an incident where Elliott "hounded" her about watching a movie in his hotel room. However the Daily Beast does not quote Lenz as saying Elliott groped her and Lenz' tweets linked in the Daily Beast article have since been deleted. In an article in The Stranger some of the accusations by Lyz Lenz were called into question.  He frequents an SM club called Eureka in Tokyo where partakes in masochistic play.

References

External links
 
 
 "Nude Awakening" - excerpt from My Girlfriend Comes to the City on Salon.com
 "Innocence Abroad" - story from Nerve.com
 Review of "The Adderall Diaries in The Las Vegas Weekly"

1971 births
Living people
American male writers
University of Illinois Urbana-Champaign alumni
Place of birth missing (living people)
Northwestern University School of Communication alumni
Mather High School alumni
BDSM writers